Bihar has length of 5,358 km  National highways.

List of National Highways in Bihar

See also 
 National highways of India
 List of National Highways in India (by Highway Number)
 National Highways Development Project
 Transport in Bihar
 List of National Highways in Bihar
 :Category:National Highways in Bihar

References